Tania Boteva-Malo (Sofia, June 10, 1950) is a Bulgarian French language writer who currently lives in Brussels. 

Born into a Francophone family, she studied French literature at the Sofia University.

Novels
Jeunes filles sur la route, 2009

Films
Trois hommes et un chien, 
Night Angels, 1995

External links

1950 births
Living people
Writers from Sofia
European writers in French
Bulgarian expatriates in Belgium
Bulgarian women writers
Sofia University alumni